Eilema squamata is a moth of the  subfamily Arctiinae. It is found on Aru and Ambon Island.

References

 Natural History Museum Lepidoptera generic names catalog

squamata